Love Always is the debut album of American R&B duo K-Ci & JoJo, released on June 17, 1997, by MCA Records. It was recorded at various studios in New York and the Los Angeles area in 1996 and 1997. It was produced by JoJo and several others, including DeVante Swing, Jon-John Robinson, James Mtume, and Jeff Redd. The duo were originally a part of Jodeci before this album.

The album peaked at number six on the US Billboard 200 and also appeared on international charts. The single "All My Life" charted number one in multiple countries, and all four of the album's singles peaked above the top 25 in the US Hot R&B/Hip-Hop Songs and the New Zealand Top 40 Singles. Love Always was received favorably by critics, who praised the brothers' singing ability and the production. The album has been certified three times platinum by the Recording Industry Association of America (RIAA) and gold by Music Canada and IFPI Sweden. It had sold more than 3 million copies in the United States.

Background 
Previously, K-Ci & JoJo had been members of the group Jodeci, which consisted of them and another pair of brothers, DeVante Swing and Mr. Dalvin. Under Uptown Records, the group released three studio albums certified platinum by the RIAA: Forever My Lady (1991), Diary of a Mad Band (1993), and The Show, the After Party, the Hotel (1995).

Jodeci has been inactive since 1996. K-Ci & JoJo, seeking to shed Jodeci's "bad boy image", began working on other projects. They appeared as featured artists in songs including Tupac Shakur's "How Do U Want It", which topped the Billboard Hot 100  and E-40's Rapper's Ball, which peaked 29th on the Hot 100. They recorded their first songs as a duo, "If You Think You're Lonely Now" and "How Could You", for the soundtrack albums Jason's Lyric and Bulletproof, respectively. Both singles reached the top 20 on Hot R&B/Hip-Hop songs.

Production, writing, and recording 

JoJo told Ebony that he and K-Ci "wrote 75 percent" of Love Always. The brothers said they wanted to make an album that everyone, including their Christian mother, would be able to listen to. K-Ci told Ebony, "We want to write songs that women can listen to. [...] You can listen to this in the car, riding with the folks." Contrasting the album with the brothers' work with Jodeci, K-Ci told Billboard, "With Jodeci, we might sing 'Freek'n You', and with K-Ci & JoJo, we don't use the word 'sex.

Love Always was the first album K-Ci & JoJo produced. Referring to DeVante Swing, who produced many of Jodeci's songs, K-Ci told Billboard, "We couldn't just say, 'Oh, DeVante's gonna make sure it's mixed right.' We had to do it." Other contributors to the album included Rory Bennett, James Mtume, Jorge Corante, Mike Smoov, Fred Rosser, Jeff Redd, Joey Wlias, Laney Stewart, Gerald Baillergeau, DeVante Swing, Derrick Garrett, Craig Brockman, Victor Merrit, Jon-John Robinson, Andrew Braxton, and Bradley Spalter. Mike Smoov, Jimi Randolph, Derrick Garrett, Thom Cadley, and Mikael Ifverson engineered the album.

Recording took place in 1996 and 1997 at recording studios in New York and the Los Angeles area: 

New York
 ACME Recording Studio in Mamaroneck
 Battery Studios in New York City
 Hit City Studio in Bronx
 Sony Music Studios in New York City
 Sony Recording Studio in New York City
 Sound Track Studio in New York City
 Startrak in New York City

Southern California
 Audio Achievements in Torrance
 Boulevard Recording Studio in Carson
 Classroom Studio in Hollywood
 Tracken Place in Los Angeles
 Tickle Box Studios in Los Angeles
 Westlake Studio in Los Angeles

Content 
Love Always is written and performed in the R&B and soul styles. It consists of slow jams and love songs. The album's opening track, "HBI", is a short introduction and is followed by "Last Night's Letter", a slow jam about broken hearts. The next song, "Baby Come Back", was written by K-Ci about his past relationship with singer Mary J. Blige. "Love Ballad" is a cover of the L.T.D. song.

Release and promotion 
Love Always was released in the United States and Germany on June 17, 1997, in Canada on June 24, 1997, and in the United Kingdom on March 20, 1999. It was released in Australia in August 1998 packaged with six bonus remixes of "How Could You", "Last Night's Letter", "All My Life", and "You Bring Me Up". The album was released on CD, cassette and LP, except in Australia, where it was only released on CD.

Singles 
Four songs on Love Always became singles. All four appeared in the top 25 on Hot R&B/Hip-Hop Songs and the New Zealand Singles Chart. The first single, "You Bring Me Up", was released on May 27, 1997. It peaked at 26th on the Billboard Hot 100, 15th on R&B/Hip Hop Songs, 15th on the New Zealand Singles Chart, and 21st on the UK Singles Chart. A remix was made featuring Snoop Dogg. The second single, "Last Night's Letter", was released on September 16, 1997. It peaked at 46th on the Hot 100, 15th on Hot R&B/Hip-Hop Songs, and 16th on the New Zealand Singles Chart.

The third single, "All My Life", was released on March 17, 1998. JoJo wrote the song about his daughter but originally intended it for another artist. In an interview with MTV, he said, "The song was originally supposed to be used for… another artist, a female artist on A&M Records. But we listened to it after we got out of the studio and it was like, 'I'm keeping this, this is too hot. "All My Life" peaked at number one on the Hot 100 and R&B/Hip-Hop Songs, tying a record set by The Beatles by jumping from 15th to first on the U.S. charts. It was also a number-one song in Australia, the Netherlands, and New Zealand. It peaked at second on the Norwegian Singles Chart, third on the Flanders Belgium Singles Chart, fourth on the Swedish Singles Chart and the Swiss Singles Chart, eighth on the UK Singles Chart, 11th on the Wallonia Belgium Singles Chart, 12th on the Austrian Singles Chart, and 43rd on the French Singles Chart. It was certified platinum by the Australian Recording Industry Association and gold by IFPI Sweden. "All My Life" was nominated for Best R&B Video at the 1999 MTV Video Music Awards.

The fourth and final single, "Don't Rush (Take Love Slowly)", was originally the B-side to "All My Life"; it was released as a single in July 1998 after it achieved more airplay than "All My Life". It peaked at 24th on the US Rhythmic Top 40, 46th on Hot R&B Airplay, 16th on the UK Singles Chart, 25th on the Dutch Singles Charts, and 26th on the New Zealand Singles Chart.

Reception

Commercial performance 
The album debuted at 24th on the US Billboard 200, and went on to peak at sixth. It peaked at second on the Billboard Top R&B/Hip-Hop Albums. On July 9, 1998, Love Always was certified three times platinum by the RIAA, for shipments of three million copies in the United States. It spent 90 weeks on the Billboard 200  and 91 weeks on the R&B/Hip-Hop Albums. As of June 1999, Love Always had sold 2.9 million copies in the US, according to Nielsen SoundScan.

Love Always charted internationally, as well. It peaked at 26th in Canada, and on June 30, 1998, it was certified platinum by Music Canada, for shipments of 100,000 copies in Canada. In Australia, the album debuted at 44th, before peaking the next week at 37th. In 1998, Love Always was certified gold by the Australian Recording Industry Association (ARIA), for shipments of 35,000 copies in Australia. It peaked at fifth in New Zealand, 19th in the Netherlands, 28th in Switzerland, 51st in the UK, and 56th in Sweden.

Critical response 

Love Always has received favorable reviews from music critics. Alex Henderson of Allmusic gave the album three stars out of five and called "Love Ballad" the "best thing the Hailey brothers have ever done – inside or outside of Jodeci".  Henderson called the album's ballads and slow jams "above average" and noted a lack of new jack swing and R-rated lyrics of the sort he had observed in Jodeci's music. He liked the songs "Now and Forever", "Still Waiting", and "Baby Come Back" and appreciated the 1970s soul music feel.

Vibe magazine's Michael Gonzalez gave the album a favorable review, writing, "Love Always is a marvelous musical testament to black love in the '90s." He enjoyed the production, especially from Rory Bennett, and compared the duo to Frankie Lymon. He noticed K-Ci's lyrics in "Baby Come Back" were about his relationship with Mary J. Blige stating "[K-Ci] wails like a man driven crazy by his missteps." Gonzalez also liked the songs "Don't Rush (Take Love Slowly)", and "You Bring Me Up". Borders Group recommended "You Bring Me Up" and praised the brothers' vocal talent.

Track listing 
Credits adapted from the album's liner notes.

Notes
 signifies a co-producer
 signifies an additional producer

Sample credits
 "Baby Come Back" contains a sample of "Whatever You Got I Want", written by Mel Larson, Jerry Marcellino, and Gene Marcellino, as performed by The Jackson 5.

Personnel 
Credits for Love Always adapted from album’s liner notes.

 Cedric "K-Ci" Hailey – lead and background vocals , vocal arrangement , executive producer
 Joel "JoJo" Hailey – lead and background vocals , producer , co-producer , vocal arrangement , executive producer

Musicians 

 Richard Adcock – cello 
 Anas Allaf – guitar , electric guitar 
 Robert Becker – viola 
 Rory Bennett – instrumentation 
 Charlie Bisharat – violin 
 Andrew Braxton – keyboards 
 Darius Campo – violin 
 Jorge "G. Man" Corante – keyboards and programming 
 Makeda Davis – background vocals 
 Basil Fearrington – bass 
 Juliann French – violin 
 Rob Fusari – additional programming 
 Berj Garabedian – violin 
 Garth Gayle – guitar 
 Harris Goldman – violin 
 Endre Granat – violin 
 Mimi Granat – viola 
 Reggie Griffith – guitar 
 Alan Grubfeld – violin 
 Reggie Hamilton – bass 
 Paula Hochhalter – cello 
 Norman Hughes – violin 
 Peter Kent – violin 
 Razdan Kuyumjian – violin 
 Ennis Melchan – violin 
 Ed "Tree" Moore – guitar 
 James Mtume – keyboards 
 Jim Mussien – drums 
 Derek Nakamoto – strings and arrangement 
 Robbie Nevil – guitar 
 Emanuel Officer – vocal arrangement , background vocals 
 Genard Parker – keyboards and drums 
 Dunn Pearson – keyboards 
 Kizi Pitfika – viola 
 Barbara Porter – violin 
 Steve Richards – cello 
 Jon-John Robinson – drums and piano 
 Anatoly Rosinsky – violin 
 Fred Rosser – drums 
 Bob Sanov – violin 
 Peter "Ski" Schwartz – strings 
 Sheila E. – percussion 
 Bradley Spalter – keyboards and programming 
 Laney Stewart – instrumentation 
 Raymond Tischer – viola 
 Randy Waldman – strings arrangement and conducting 
 Ken Yerke – violin

Production 

 Steve B. – assistant engineer 
 Gerald Baillergeau – producer, engineer, and mixing 
 Rory Bennett – producer 
 Kyle Bess – assistant mix engineer 
 Allen Bishop – engineer 
 Stuart Brawley – assistant mix engineer 
 Andrew Braxton – additional production 
 Craig Brockman – co-producer 
 Thom Cadley – engineer 
 Bill Carr – assistant engineer 
 Cecil T. Chambers – production coordination 
 Rob Chiarelli – mixing 
 Jorge "G. Man" Corante – producer 
 Tom Coyne – mastering 
 Martin Czembor – assistant mix engineer 
 Kevin "KD" Davis – mixing 
 Joey Elias – co-producer 
 Derrick Garrett – producer and engineer 
 Jon Gass – mixing 
 Bryan Golder – assistant engineer 
 Chris Habeck – Pro Tools transfer 
 Mikael Ifversen – engineer 
 Mauricio Iragorri – assistant mix engineer 
 Damon Jones – executive producer
 Adam Kagen – engineer 
 Adam Kudzin – mixing 
 Ernie Lake – engineer 
 Tommy Lockheart – assistant Pro Tools transfer 
 Charity Lomax – assistant engineer 
 Manny Marroquin – engineer 
 Victor Merrit – producer, engineer, and mixing 
 James Mtume – producer and engineer 
 Greg Mull – engineer 
 Rene Ochoa – project coordinator 
 Emanuel Officer – producer 
 Genard Parker – producer and mixing 
 Kelvin Parker – engineer 
 David Pelman – engineer 
 Dave "Hard Drive" Pensado – mixing 
 Jimi Randolph – engineer 
 Jeff Redd – producer , executive producer
 Vince Reynolds – assistant engineer 
 Jon-John Robinson – producer 
 Fred Rosser – additional production 
 Mike Scielzi – engineer 
 Matt Silva – assistant mix engineer 
 Mike Smoov – producer and engineer 
 Bradley Spalter – producer 
 Laney Stewart – producer 
 DeVante Swing – producer and engineer 
 Tom Vercillo – mixing 
 Brian Vibberts – assistant engineer 
 Eric White – assistant engineer 
 Jeffrey "Woody" Woodruff – engineer

Charts

Weekly charts

Year-end charts

Certifications

Release history

References

External links 
 
 [ Love Always] at Billboard
 

1997 debut albums
K-Ci & JoJo albums
Albums produced by Craig Brockman
Albums produced by Laney Stewart